Chimamanda Ngozi Adichie (born 15 September 1977) is a Nigerian writer whose works include novels, short stories and nonfiction. She was described in The Times Literary Supplement as "the most prominent" of a "procession of critically acclaimed young anglophone authors [which] is succeeding in attracting a new generation of readers to African literature", particularly in her second home, the United States.

Adichie has written the novels Purple Hibiscus (2003), Half of a Yellow Sun (2006), and Americanah (2013), the short story collection The Thing Around Your Neck (2009), and the book-length essay We Should All Be Feminists (2014). Her most recent books are Dear Ijeawele, or A Feminist Manifesto in Fifteen Suggestions (2017), Zikora (2020) and Notes on Grief (2021). 

In 2008, she was awarded a MacArthur Genius Grant. She was the recipient of the PEN Pinter Prize in 2018. She was recognized as one of the BBC's 100 women of 2021.

Early life and family
Adichie was born in the city of Enugu in Nigeria, the fifth of six children in an Igbo family. She was raised in the university town of Nsukka in Enugu State. While she was growing up, her father, James Nwoye Adichie (1932–2020), worked as a professor of statistics at the University of Nigeria. Her mother, Grace Ifeoma (1942–2021), was the university's first female registrar. They lived in a house on campus previously occupied by Chinua Achebe. The family lost almost everything during the Nigerian Civil War, including both her maternal and paternal grandfathers. Her family's ancestral village is Abba in Anambra State.

Education 
Adichie completed her secondary education at the University of Nigeria Secondary School, Nsukka, where she received several academic prizes. She studied medicine and pharmacy at the University of Nigeria for a year and a half. During this period, she edited The Compass, a magazine run by the university's Catholic medical students.

At the age of 19, Adichie left Nigeria for the United States to study communications and political science at Drexel University in Philadelphia, Pennsylvania. She transferred to Eastern Connecticut State University (ECSU) to be near her sister Uche, who had a medical practice in Coventry, Connecticut. She received a bachelor's degree from ECSU, summa cum laude, in 2001.

In 2003, Adichie completed a master's degree in creative writing at Johns Hopkins University.  Adichie was a Hodder fellow at Princeton University during the 2005–2006 academic year.  In 2008, she received a Master of Arts degree in African studies from Yale University. Also in 2008, she was awarded a MacArthur Fellowship. She was awarded a 2011–2012 fellowship by the Radcliffe Institute for Advanced Study, Harvard University.

Adichie has been awarded sixteen honorary doctorate degrees from universities including Yale University, the University of Pennsylvania, the University of Edinburgh, Duke University, Georgetown University, Johns Hopkins University, and the Catholic University of Louvain, where she received her sixteenth in a ceremony on 28 April 2022.

Writing career 
Adichie published a collection of poems in 1997 (Decisions) and a play (For Love of Biafra) in 1998, using the name Amanda N. Adichie. Her short story "My Mother, the Crazy African", dating from when Adichie was a college senior living in Connecticut, discusses the problems that arise when a person is facing two cultures that are complete opposites from each other.

Adichie also published stories in Zoetrope: All-Story, and Topic Magazine.

Her first novel, Purple Hibiscus (2003), received widespread critical acclaim; it was shortlisted for the Orange Prize for Fiction (2004) and was awarded the Commonwealth Writers' Prize for Best First Book (2005).

Her second novel, Half of a Yellow Sun (2006), named after the flag of the short-lived nation of Biafra, is set before and during the Nigerian Civil War. Adichie's own grandfather died in a refugee camp during the war and she has said that she wrote the book as a tribute to him. Adichie has said of Buchi Emecheta's Destination Biafra (1982): "[It] was very important for my research when I was writing Half of a Yellow Sun." Half of a Yellow Sun received the 2007 Orange Prize for Fiction and the Anisfield-Wolf Book Award. Half of a Yellow Sun was adapted into a film of the same title directed by Biyi Bandele, starring BAFTA award-winner and Academy Award nominee Chiwetel Ejiofor and BAFTA winner Thandiwe Newton, and was released in 2014. In November 2020, Half of a Yellow Sun was voted by the public to be the best book to have won the Women's Prize for Fiction in its 25-year history.

Adichie's third book, The Thing Around Your Neck (2009), is a collection of 12 stories that explore the relationships between men and women, parents and children, Africa and the United States.

Adichie's story "Ceiling" was included in the 2011 edition of The Best American Short Stories.

Her third novel Americanah (2013), an exploration of a young Nigerian encountering race in America was selected by The New York Times as one of "The 10 Best Books of 2013". As a youth in Nigeria, Adichie was not accustomed to being identified by the colour of her skin, which only began to happen when she arrived in the United States for college. As a black African in America, Adichie was confronted with what it meant to be a person of colour in the United States. Race as an idea became something that she had to navigate and learn. She then wrote about this experience through this novel. The book went on to win the National Book Critics Circle Award and was picked as the winner for the 2017 "One Book, One New York" program, part of a community reading initiative encouraging all city residents to read the same book.

In 2015, she was co-curator of the PEN World Voices Festival.

Her next book, Dear Ijeawele, or A Feminist Manifesto in Fifteen Suggestions, published in March 2017, had its origins in a letter Adichie wrote to a friend who had asked for advice about how to raise her daughter as a feminist.

In 2020, Adichie published Zikora, a stand-alone short story about sexism and single motherhood.

In May 2021, Adichie released a memoir based on her father's death titled Notes on Grief, based on an essay of the same title published in The New Yorker in September 2020. As described by the reviewer for The Independent, "Her words put a welcome, authentic voice to this most universal of emotions, which is also one of the most universally avoided."

When history professor Toyin Falola was interviewed, he spoke about some Nigerian figures whom he believes have been recognised prematurely for their achievements. In his argument, he cites several Nigerian academics who are rightly what he calls "intellectual heroes". His list includes Chimamanda Ngozi Adichie, Chinua Achebe, Teslim Elias, Babatunde Fafunwa, Simeon Adebo, Bala Usman, Eni Njoku, Ayodele Awojobi and Bolanle Awe.

Influences 
Ngozi Adichie's original and initial inspiration came from Chinua Achebe, after reading his 1958 novel Things Fall Apart at the age of 10; Adichie has said that she realized that people who looked like herself could "live in books" while reading Achebe's novels. She has also named Buchi Emecheta as a Nigerian literary inspiration, upon whose death Adichie said: "Buchi Emecheta. We are able to speak because you first spoke. Thank you for your courage. Thank you for your art  ." Other books Adichie has cited as having been important in her reading include Camara Laye's The African Child and the 1992 anthology Daughters of Africa edited by Margaret Busby.

Lectures

"The Danger of a Single Story" 

Adichie delivered a talk titled "The Danger of a Single Story" for TED in 2009. It has become one of the most-viewed TED Talks of all time, having amassed over 33 million views.  In the talk she expressed her concern for under-representation of various cultures. She explained that as a young child, she had often read American and British stories where the characters were primarily of Caucasian origin. At the lecture, she said that the under-representation of cultural differences could be dangerous. Adichie concluded the lecture by noting the significance of different stories in various cultures and the representation that they deserve. She advocated for a greater understanding of stories because people are complex, saying that by understanding only a single story, one misinterprets people, their backgrounds, and their histories. Since 2009, she revisited the topic when speaking to audiences such as the Hilton Humanitarian Symposium of the Conrad N. Hilton Foundation in 2019.

"We should all be feminists"
In 2012, Adichie gave a TEDx talk entitled: "We should all be feminists", delivered at TedXEuston in London, which has been viewed more than five million times and was later published as a book in 2014 by Fourth Estate titled We Should All Be Feminists. The book has reportedly sold 750,000 copies in the U.S. alone. She shared her experiences of being an African feminist, and her views on gender construction and sexuality. Adichie said that the problem with gender is that it shapes who we are. She also said: "I am angry. Gender as it functions today is a grave injustice. We should all be angry. Anger has a long history of bringing about positive change, but in addition to being angry, I'm also hopeful because I believe deeply in the ability of human beings to make and remake themselves for the better." On 8 December 2021, Adichie was interviewed by BBC News about the responsibility of being a feminist icon; she stated that she did not want another person to define her responsibility and she rather defined her responsibility for herself but did not mind using her platform to speak up for someone else. She also spoke about the right of women to be angry, because anger propels action.

Sampling in "Flawless"
Parts of Adichie's TEDx talk were sampled in Beyoncé's song "Flawless" in December 2013.

When asked in an NPR interview for her reaction to Beyoncé sampling her talk, Adichie said that "anything that gets young people talking about feminism is a very good thing". She later qualified the statement in an interview with the Dutch newspaper De Volkskrant: "Another thing I hated was that I read everywhere: now people finally know her, thanks to Beyoncé, or: she must be very grateful. I found that disappointing. I thought: I am a writer and I have been for some time and I refuse to perform in this charade that is now apparently expected of me: 'Thanks to Beyoncé, my life will never be the same again.' That's why I didn't speak about it much."

Adichie has clarified that her particular feminism differs from Beyoncé's, particularly in their disagreements about the role occupied by men in women's lives, saying: "Her style is not my style but I do find it interesting that she takes a stand in political and social issues since a few years. She portrays a woman who is in charge of her own destiny, who does her own thing, and she has girl power. I am very taken with that." Nevertheless, Adichie has been outspoken against critics who question the singer's credentials as a feminist, and has said: "Whoever says they're feminist is bloody feminist."

"Connecting Cultures" 
On 15 March 2012, Adichie delivered the Commonwealth Lecture 2012 at the Guildhall, London, addressing the theme "Connecting Cultures" and explaining: "Realistic fiction is not merely the recording of the real, as it were, it is more than that, it seeks to infuse the real with meaning. As events unfold, we do not always know what they mean. But in telling the story of what happened, meaning emerges and we are able to make connections with emotive significance."

"Freedom of speech" 
On 30 November 2022, Adichie delivered the first of the BBC's 2022 Reith Lectures inspired by Franklin D. Roosevelt's "Four Freedoms" speech.

Views

Feminism 
In a 2014 interview, Adichie said on feminism and writing: "I think of myself as a storyteller but I would not mind at all if someone were to think of me as a feminist writer ... I'm very feminist in the way I look at the world, and that world view must somehow be part of my work."

Religion 
Adichie is a Catholic and was raised Catholic as a child, though she considers her views, especially those on feminism, to sometimes conflict with her religion. At a 2017 event at Georgetown University, she stated that religion "is not a women-friendly institution" and "has been used to justify oppressions that are based on the idea that women are not equal human beings". She has called for Christian and Muslim leaders in Nigeria to preach messages of peace and togetherness. Having previously identified as agnostic while raising her daughter Catholic, she has also identified as culturally Catholic. In a 2021 Humboldt Forum, she stated that she had returned to her Catholic faith.

LGBT rights
Adichie supports LGBT rights in Africa; in 2014, when Nigeria passed an anti-homosexuality bill, she was among the Nigerian writers who objected to the law, calling it unconstitutional and "a strange priority to a country with so many real problems", stating that a crime is a crime for a reason because a crime has victims, and that since consensual homosexual conduct between adults does not constitute a crime, the law is unjust. Adichie was also close friends with Kenyan openly gay writer Binyavanga Wainaina, and when he died on 21 May 2019 after suffering a stroke in Nairobi, Adichie said in her tribute that she was struggling to stop crying.

Since 2017, Adichie has been repeatedly accused of transphobia, initially for saying that "my feeling is trans women are trans women" in response to the question "Are trans women women?" Adichie later clarified her statement, writing: "[p]erhaps I should have said trans women are trans women and cis women are cis women and all are women. Except that 'cis' is not an organic part of my vocabulary. And would probably not be understood by a majority of people. Because saying 'trans' and 'cis' acknowledges that there is a distinction between women born female and women who transition, without elevating one or the other, which was my point. I have and will continue to stand up for the rights of transgender people."

In 2020, Adichie weighed into "all the noise" sparked by J. K. Rowling's article titled "J.K. Rowling Writes about Her Reasons for Speaking out on Sex and Gender Issues", and called the essay "perfectly reasonable". Adichie again faced accusations of transphobia, some of which came from Nigerian author Akwaeke Emezi, who had graduated from Adichie's writing workshop. In response to the backlash, Adichie criticised cancel culture, saying: "There's a sense in which you aren't allowed to learn and grow. Also forgiveness is out of the question. I find it so lacking in compassion."

In a June 2021 essay titled "It Is Obscene", Adichie again criticised cancel culture, discussing her experiences with two unnamed writers who attended her writing workshop and later lambasted her on social media over comments she made about transgender people. She labelled what she called their "passionate performance of virtue that is well executed in the public space of Twitter but not in the intimate space of friendship" as "obscene".

Personal life
In 2009, Adichie married Ivara Esege, a Nigerian doctor. They have one daughter, who was born in 2016.

Adichie divides her time between the United States and Nigeria, where she teaches writing workshops.

Awards and recognition

In 2002, she was shortlisted for the Caine Prize for African Writing for her short story "You in America", and her story "That Harmattan Morning" was selected as a joint winner of the 2002 BBC World Service Short Story Awards. In 2003, she won the David T. Wong International Short Story Prize 2002/2003 (PEN Center Award).

In 2010 she was listed among the authors of The New Yorkers "20 Under 40" Fiction Issue. In April 2014, she was named as one of 39 writers aged under 40 in the Hay Festival and Rainbow Book Club project Africa39, celebrating Port Harcourt UNESCO World Book Capital 2014. In April 2017, it was announced that Adichie had been elected, as one of 228 new members to ube inducted on 7 October 2017,into the 237th class of the American Academy of Arts and Sciences; this was one of the highest honours for intellectuals in the United States.

Adichie holds 16 honorary doctorate degrees from universities including Yale University, the University of Pennsylvania, the University of Edinburgh, Duke University, Georgetown University, Johns Hopkins University, and the Catholic University of Louvain.
In 2016, she was conferred with an honorary degree, Doctor of Humane letters, honoris causa, by Johns Hopkins University. In 2017, she was conferred an honorary degree, Doctor of Humane letters, honoris causa, by Haverford College and The University of Edinburgh. In 2018, she received an honorary degree, Doctor of Humane Letters, from Amherst College. She received an honorary degree, doctor honoris causa, from the Université de Fribourg, Switzerland, in 2019. On 20 May 2019, Ngozi Adichie received an honorary degree from Yale University. 
On 28 April 2022, she received her 16th honorary doctorate degree from the Catholic University of Louvain.

On 13 October 2022, a member of Adichie ’s communications team told the Nigerian newspaper The Guardian that she rejected an award that was to be given to her by the government of President Muhammadu Buhari: "The author did not accept the award and, as such, did not attend the ceremony." On 30 December 2022, Adichie was made the Odeluwa of Abba, a Nigerian chief, by the kingdom of Abba in her native Anambra State. She was the first woman to receive such an honour from the kingdom.

A Shortlisted
B Runner-up
C Joint win
D Longlisted

Other recognition
2010 Listed among The New Yorkers "20 Under 40"
2013 Listed among The New York Times "Ten Best Books of 2013", for Americanah
2013 Listed among the BBC's "Top Ten Books of 2013", for Americanah
2013 Foreign Policy magazine "Top Global Thinkers of 2013"
2013 Listed among the New Africans "100 Most Influential Africans 2013"
2014 Listed among Africa39 project of 39 writers aged under 40
2015 Listed among Time magazine's "100 Most Influential People"
 2015 Commencement Speaker at Wellesley College
 2017 Commencement Speaker at Williams College
2018 Class Day Speaker for Harvard University.
2019 Class Day Speaker for Yale University.
 Adichie was one of 15 women selected to appear on the cover of the September 2019 issue of British Vogue, guest-edited by Meghan, Duchess of Sussex.
Adichie was cited as one of the Top 100 most influential Africans by New African magazine in 2019.
Chimamanda was also elected in March 2017 into the American Academy of Arts and Letters. This made her the second Nigerian to be given such an honour, after Prof. Wole Soyinka. She was listed among the 40 Honorary members from 19 countries.

Bibliography

Books

Short fiction

See also

List of Nigerian women writers
Postcolonial feminist literature

References

Notes

Citations

Further reading
 Ernest N. Emenyonu (ed.), A Companion to Chimamanda Ngozi Adichie, James Currey/Boydell and Brewer, 2017, 
 Ojo, Akinleye Ayinuola, "Discursive Construction of Sexuality and Sexual Orientations in Chimamanda Adichie's Americanah". Ibadan Journal of English Studies 7 (2018): 543-560-224.

External links

 
 Adichie on Twitter
 Adichie on Facebook
 Britannica about Adichie
 Unofficial website via Daria Tunca, English Department, University of Liège.
 
 
 
 
 
 
 
 
 . 16 March 2012.
 
  
 

1977 births
Living people
21st-century American women writers
21st-century essayists
21st-century Nigerian educators
21st-century Nigerian novelists
21st-century Nigerian women writers
21st-century short story writers
21st-century women educators
American short story writers
American women academics
American women dramatists and playwrights
American women short story writers
American writers of African descent
Drexel University alumni
Eastern Connecticut State University alumni
English-language poets
Feminism and transgender
Feminist writers
Igbo academics
Igbo activists
Igbo dramatists and playwrights
Igbo educators
Igbo novelists
Igbo poets
Igbo short story writers
Igbo women writers
Johns Hopkins University alumni
MacArthur Fellows
Nigerian dramatists and playwrights
Nigerian expatriate academics in the United States
Nigerian feminists
Nigerian Roman Catholics
Nigerian short story writers
Nigerian women academics
Nigerian women educators
Nigerian women novelists
Nigerian women poets
Nigerian women short story writers
The New Yorker people
Wesleyan University faculty
Women essayists
O. Henry Award winners
Writers from Enugu
Yale Graduate School of Arts and Sciences alumni
BBC 100 Women